U1 University is a private university located in Yeongdong-eup, Yeongdong County, North Chungcheong province, South Korea.  It employs around 65 full-time instructors.  Although traditionally focused on engineering, the university now offers degree programs in a range of fields including English as an international language, leisure studies, and special education.

History
The Geumgang Educational Foundation received governmental permission to establish the college in 1993, and the first students were welcomed into Youngdong Engineering College (영동공과대학) on March 8, 1994.  It became a university in the following year, and changed its name to simply Youngdong University on December 1, 1997.

See also
List of colleges and universities in South Korea
Education in South Korea

External links 
Official website

Universities and colleges in North Chungcheong Province
Yeongdong County
Educational institutions established in 1994
1994 establishments in South Korea